Helen Leadbeater may refer to:

Helen Leadbeater, birth name of politician, Jo Cox
Helen Leadbeater, writer on Jupiter Moon